The Țelna is a left tributary of the river Ighiu in Romania. It flows into the Ighiu in the village Ighiu.

References

Rivers of Romania
Rivers of Alba County